This is a list of every 2015–16 National League 3 Midlands matchday results.

Results

Matchday 1

Matchday 2

Matchday 3

Matchday 4

Matchday 5

Matchday 6

Matchday 7

Matchday 8

Matchday 9

Matchday 10

Matchday 11

Matchday 12

Matchday 13

Matchday 14

Matchday 15

Matchday 16 (4/7)

Matchday 17

Matchday 18

Matchday 16 (7/7)

Matchday 19

Matchday 20

Matchday 21

Matchday 22

Matchday 23

Matchday 24

Matchday 25

Matchday 26

2015–16 in English rugby union leagues